This list of Bradley University people includes alumni and faculty of Bradley University, a private, mid-sized university in Peoria, Illinois founded in 1897.

Alumni

Government, public service, and public policy
 David Brant — former director of Naval Criminal Investigative Service
 Richard E. Carver — former Mayor of Peoria and 16th Assistant Secretary of the U.S. Air Force
 Brad Cohen — motivational speaker and teacher
 Tom Fink — former mayor of Anchorage, Alaska and Speaker of Alaska House of Representatives
 Joseph R. Holzapple — U.S. Air Force four-star general
 Laura Kelly — 48th Governor of Kansas
 Robin Kelly — U.S. Congresswoman from Illinois' 2nd District
 Morris Kleiner — AFL-CIO Professor of Public Policy, Humphrey School, University of Minnesota 
 Ray LaHood — U.S. Congressman from Illinois' 18th District and former United States Secretary of Transportation
 Ali al-Marri — convicted 9/11 co-conspirator 
 Judge Joe Billy McDade — Senior United States District Judge for the Central District of Illinois (BS '59, MS '60)
 Robert H. Michel — U.S. Congressman from Illinois' 18th District and longest serving Republican leader of the U.S. House of Representatives
 Nicholas Scoppetta — New York City Fire Commissioner
 James E. Shadid — Chief United States District Judge for Central District of Illinois
 General John M. Shalikashvili — retired chairman of the Joint Chiefs of Staff and former Supreme Allied Commander of NATO
 Jerald D. Slack — U.S. Air National Guard Major General, Adjutant General of Wisconsin
 Ryan Spain — Member of the Illinois House of Representatives from the 74th district
 Scott Randolph — Orange County Tax Collector and former member of the Florida House of Representatives
 Aaron Schock — former member of the US House of Representatives
 Michael D Unes — Member of the Illinois House of Representatives from the 91st district and Assistant Minority Leader
 Chuck Weaver — Member of the Illinois Senate from the 37th District

Literature, arts, and media
 Cecil Baldwin — voice of Cecil Palmer, the narrator of the podcast Welcome to Night Vale
 Jill Bennett — actress
 Merle Boyer—jewelry designer
 Jack Brickhouse — Baseball Hall of Fame radio and TV announcer for the Chicago Cubs
 Cardon V. Burnham — musical composer, arranger, conductor, performer
 Hal Corley — five-time Emmy Award-winning TV writer, nationally produced and published playwright
 Philip José Farmer — author, known for science fiction and fantasy novels
 Neil Flynn — actor best known for his roles on Scrubs and The Middle
 Jerry Hadley — lyric tenor for the New York Metropolitan Opera
 Chick Hearn — Basketball Hall of Fame play-by-play announcer for the Los Angeles Lakers
 David Horowitz — consumer advocate
 Tami Lane — Academy Award winner (makeup, The Chronicles of Narnia: The Lion, the Witch and the Wardrobe)
 Ralph Lawler — TV and radio play-by-play announcer for the Los Angeles Clippers
 Jeff Mauro — television personality on Food Network
 Lyall Smith — sportswriter, editor and Detroit Lions public-relations director 
 Charley Steiner — sportscaster, ESPN's SportsCenter, radio announcer for New York Yankees and Los Angeles Dodgers
 Richard Thomas - author, known for his neo-noir and speculative fiction 
 Timothy Treadwell — environmentalist and documentarian, star of Animal Planet's Grizzly Man Diaries
 Eric Petersen — actor, best known for role of Kevin in AMC's Kevin Can F**k Himself
 Michelle Young — American television personality best known for being the Runner up on The Bachelor season 25 and being the lead of The Bachelorette season 18

Business and science
 Dr. Lillian Glass — expert in body language, columnist, TV commentator
 Jerry Hayden — former President of Peacock Engineering
 John R. Horne (MS 1964) — former CEO of Navistar
 Ernst Ising — worked on 1D Ising model of ferromagnets
 Howard Lance — chairman, president, and chief executive officer at Harris Corporation
 Major Robert Henry Lawrence, Jr. — became the first African American astronaut in 1967
 J.J. Liu — software engineer; one of the top women poker players in the world
 Timothy L. Mounts — agricultural chemist specializing in edible oilseed
 George T. Shaheen — former CEO of Siebel Systems, Andersen Consulting, and Webvan
 Gerald L. Shaheen — former chairman of U.S. Chamber of Commerce and its current treasurer; retired group president of Caterpillar
 Louis Skidmore — architect and co-founder of Skidmore, Owings & Merrill

Athletics

Alon Badat (born 1989) - Israeli soccer player
 Pat Brady — professional football player for Pittsburgh Steelers
 Gavin Glinton — professional soccer player for Nam Dinh FC and Turks and Caicos Islands national football team
 Curt Hasler — professional baseball player and current bullpen coach for Chicago White Sox
 Hersey Hawkins — professional basketball player for Chicago Bulls, Seattle SuperSonics, Charlotte Hornets and Philadelphia 76ers; also bronze medalist, 1988 Summer Olympics; all-time leading scorer for Bradley men's basketball
 Harry Jacobs — professional football player for Boston Patriots, Buffalo Bills and New Orleans Saints
Scottie James (born 1996) - basketball player for Hapoel Haifa in the Israeli Basketball Premier League
 Jerry Krause — legendary General Manager for the Chicago Bulls; managed the Bulls to six NBA Championships and two-time recipient of the NBA's Executive of the Year award
 Walt Lemon Jr. (born 1992) - basketball player in the Israel Basketball Premier League
 Jim Les — professional basketball player for Utah Jazz, Los Angeles Clippers, Sacramento Kings and Atlanta Hawks; assistant coach for WNBA's Sacramento Monarchs; former head coach at Bradley
 Bobby Joe Mason — professional basketball player for Harlem Globetrotters
 Shellie McMillon — professional basketball player for Detroit Pistons
 Gene Melchiorre — basketball player, first overall pick in 1951 NBA Draft
 Steve Miller — coach, Kansas State athletic director, Nike and Professional Bowlers Association executive, University of Oregon faculty member
 Dennis Morgan — professional football player for Dallas Cowboys and Philadelphia Eagles
 Bryan Namoff — soccer player, defensive starter for Major League Soccer team D.C. United
 Patrick O'Bryant — professional basketball player drafted ninth overall in the 2006 NBA Draft by Golden State Warriors
 Anthony Parker — professional basketball player for Toronto Raptors, Orlando Magic, Philadelphia 76ers, and Cleveland Cavaliers
 Marcus Pollard — professional football player for Detroit Lions, Indianapolis Colts and Seattle Seahawks
 Kirby Puckett — professional baseball player for Minnesota Twins inducted into Baseball Hall of Fame
 Ray Ramsey — professional football player for the Chicago Cardinals
 Bryan Rekar — professional baseball player for Colorado Rockies, Tampa Bay Devil Rays, and Kansas City Royals
 Bill Roehnelt — professional football player for Chicago Bears, Washington Redskins and Denver Broncos
 Matt Savoie — figure skater, U.S. bronze medalist, member of 2006 Winter Olympics U.S. team
 Rob Scahill — professional baseball player for Colorado Rockies and Pittsburgh Pirates
 Leo Schrall — baseball head coach from 1949 through 1972, led Bradley Braves to two College World Series appearances and five Missouri Valley Conference championships
 Brian Shouse — professional baseball player for Tampa Bay Rays
 Bill Stone — football player, halfback for Baltimore Colts, Chicago Bears ('51–'54), Bradley football head coach
 Levern Tart — professional basketball player for several ABA teams
 Mike Tauchman (born 1990) - outfielder for the San Francisco Giants of Major League Baseball
 David Thirdkill — professional basketball player, member of 1985–86 Boston Celtics championship team, also played for Detroit Pistons and Phoenix Suns, 1993 Israeli Basketball Premier League MVP
 Bill Tuttle — professional baseball player for Detroit Tigers, Kansas City Athletics, and Minnesota Twins
 John M. Veitch — Hall of Fame thoroughbred racehorse trainer
 Chet Walker — Naismith Memorial Basketball Hall of Fame inductee, professional basketball player for Syracuse Nationals, Philadelphia 76ers, and Chicago Bulls

Faculty
People who did not attend Bradley as a student but were on the Bradley staff or faculty include:
 John R. Brazil — president of Bradley, 1992–2000
Phil Crane — Member of the U.S. House of Representatives from Illinois's 13th district (1969-1973), 12th district (1973-1993), and 8th district (1993-2005)
 Claire Etaugh — Dean of the College of Liberal Arts and Sciences
 Ernst Ising — German physicist: developed the Ising model in statistical mechanics
 Sibyl Moholy-Nagy - German-American architectural writer, in 1948
 David P. Schmitt — Personality psychologist, founder of the International Sexuality Description Project, (1995–present)
 Kevin Stein — Poet Laureate of Illinois (2003–present)
 Charles E. Tucker, Jr. — retired U.S. Air Force Major General and Executive Director of the World Engagement Institute
Olive B. White — novelist, English professor, longtime Dean of Women

References

External links
 

 
Bradley University